Botany Parish, Cumberland is one of the 57 parishes of Cumberland County, New South Wales, a cadastral unit for use on land titles.  It contains the area to the north of Botany Bay and to the east of part of Cooks River. It includes the suburbs of La Perouse, Hillsdale, Banksmeadow and Maroubra. It also includes Sydney Airport. It roughly corresponds to the "South-Eastern Suburbs" of Sydney, which are sometimes counted as part of the Eastern Suburbs together with the suburbs in the Parish of Alexandria to the north.

References

Parishes of Cumberland County